The Chieftains  is the first album released by the Irish musical group The Chieftains in 1964. The album is now sometimes referred to as The Chieftains 1 due to the numbering system of their subsequent albums. It was one of the first folk albums to be recorded in stereo.

Track listing
All tracks Traditional compositions
"Sé Fáth mo Bhuartha / The Lark on the Strand / An Fhallaingín Mhuimhneach / Trim the Velvet"  – 
"An Comhra Donn / Murphy's Hornpipe"  – 
"Cailín na Gruaige Doinne" (The Brown-Haired Girl)  – 
"Comb Your Hair and Curl It / The Boys of Ballisodare"  – 
"The Musical Priest / The Queen of May"  – 
"The Walls of Liscarroll Jig"  – 
"An Dhruimfhionn Donn Dílis"  – 
"The Connemara Stocking / The Limestone Rock / Dan Breen's"  – 
"Casadh an tSúgan"  – 
"The Boy in the Gap"  – 
"Saint Mary's, Church Street / Garret Barry, The Battering Ram / Kitty goes a-Milking, Rakish Paddy"  –

Personnel
The Chieftains
Paddy Moloney  – uilleann pipes, tin whistle, arrangements, musical direction
Martin Fay  – fiddle
Seán Potts  – tin whistle
Michael Tubridy  – flute, concertina, tin whistle
David Fallon  – bodhrán
Technical
Morgan O'Sullivan - recording engineer
Edward Delaney - cover design

References

Sources and links
 This album on the Chieftains' Official site

1964 debut albums
The Chieftains albums
Claddagh Records albums